Tylophoron is a genus of lichen-forming fungi in the family Arthoniaceae. The genus was circumscribed in 1862 by Finnish lichenologist William Nylander.

Species
Tylophoron galapagoense 
Tylophoron gibsonii 
Tylophoron hibernicum 
Tylophoron moderatum 
Tylophoron protrudens 
Tylophoron stalactiticum 

Species formerly placed in Tylophoron:
Tylophoron americanum  = Sporodophoron americanum
Tylophoron hawaiense  = Nadvornikia hawaiensis
Tylophoron indicum  = Pyrgillus indicus
Tylophoron triloculare  = Heterocyphelium leucampyx

References

Arthoniomycetes
Lichen genera
Taxa described in 1862
Taxa named by William Nylander (botanist)